Kriezis ( is a Greek surname.

It may refer to:

Antonios Kriezis (1796-1865), Greek military figure and politician
Andreas Kriezis (c.1813-c.1880), Greek painter
Dimitrios Kriezis, Greek naval officer

Greek-language surnames
Surnames